Dieter Pfaff (2 October 1947 – 5 March 2013) was a German actor and director.

The son of a police officer, Pfaff was  best known as police officer Hans Sperling in the series Sperling. Sperling also appeared in two films about Swedish policeman Martin Beck, namely Flickan i jordkällaren and Den japanska shungamålningen. In 2002, he starred in Goebbels und Geduldig. Between 1984 and 1996, he played Otto Schatzschneider in the German krimi series Der Fahnder.

Pfaff and his wife Eva Maria Emminger had two children, twins Johanna and Maximilian. Pfaff was professor for acting at the Graz University of Music and Performing Arts from 1983 until 1990.

Death
Pfaff was diagnosed with lung cancer in 2012, and died on 5 March 2013, aged 65.

Selected filmography
 Der Fahnder (1984–1996, TV series, 109 episodes), as Otto Schatzschneider
  (1994, TV film), as Hauptkommissar Paule Pietsch
 Balko (1995–1997, TV series, 22 episodes), as Kriminaloberrat Vollmer
  (1996–2007, TV series, 18 episodes), as Kommissar Hans Sperling
 Bruder Esel (1996, TV series, 14 episodes), as Ludger Spengler
  (1999), as Mick Meyer
 Goebbels und Geduldig (2001), as Eugen Haase
 Die Affäre Semmeling (2002, TV miniseries), as Hermann Schomberg
 Bloch (2002–2013, TV series, 24 episodes), as Dr. Maximilian Bloch
  (2003, TV film), as Hans-Dietrich Genscher
 Der Dicke (2005–2012, TV series, 52 episodes), as Gregor Ehrenberg
 Beck – Flickan i jordkällaren (2006, TV), as Kommissar Hans Sperling
 Beck – Den japanska shungamålningen (2007, TV), as Kommissar Hans Sperling

References

External links

 

1947 births
2013 deaths
German male film actors
German male television actors
20th-century German male actors
21st-century German male actors
Deaths from cancer in Germany